Camping Out is a 1919 American short comedy film directed by and starring Fatty Arbuckle. The two-reel film was considered lost until recently. Most of the film has been reconstructed from reels found in the Nederlands Filmmuseum and Cineteca Nazionale storage vaults in Rome in 2002.

Plot
A man runs away from his wife's bad cooking, camps out on Santa Catalina Island, and attempts to do his own cooking.

Cast
 Roscoe 'Fatty' Arbuckle
 Al St. John
 Alice Lake
 Monty Banks

See also
 Fatty Arbuckle filmography
 List of American films of 1919
 List of rediscovered films

References

External links

1919 films
1919 comedy films
1919 short films
1910s rediscovered films
American screwball comedy films
American silent short films
American black-and-white films
Silent American comedy films
Films directed by Roscoe Arbuckle
Films with screenplays by Roscoe Arbuckle
American comedy short films
Rediscovered American films
1910s American films